Saw Beza was a queen consort of King Swa Saw Ke of Ava. She was the mother of King Minkhaung I of Ava, Gov. Theiddat of Sagaing, and Queen Thupaba Dewi of Hanthawaddy Pegu.

Brief
The future queen was a commoner named Mi Beza from a small village named Gazun-Neint (ကန်စွန်းနိမ့်) near Mohnyin (in present-day Kachin State). King Swa met her at her village in the dry season of 1372–73 while he was on campaign to Mohnyin. The king took her as a concubine during the campaign. After the campaign, he told her to come to Ava (Inwa) if she bore him a son. She gave birth to a son (later King Minkhaung I) on 13 October 1373, after which she went to Ava. The king, as promised, raised her to queen. They had two more children.

References

Bibliography
 

Queens consort of Ava
14th-century Burmese women